The women's long jump at the 2018 IAAF World Indoor Championships took place at Arena Birmingham in Birmingham, United Kingdom, on 4 March 2018.

Summary
Brittney Reese entered the competition as defending champion and reigning world champion outdoors. Leading the world on distance was Serbia's Ivana Španović, with the European champion and 2016 World Indoor runner-up having cleared . With just one centimetre less was emerging athlete Khaddi Sagnia, who had equalled the Swedish record in February. As winner of the IAAF World Indoor Tour, Germany's Sosthene Moguenara-Taroum received a wildcard entry.

Until the final jumper of the first round, Quanesha Burks's personal best 6.81m held the lead until Španović took the lead with a 6.89m. In the second round, Sosthene Moguenara moved into second place with a 6.85m which would be her best of the day. In the fourth round, the top two places were decided. First Reese moved into the lead by equalling Španović's 6.89m, also holding the better second best jump tiebreaker. The same top two medalist as in 2016, but in reverse order.

Results
The final was started at 15:27.

References

Long jump
Long jump at the World Athletics Indoor Championships
2018 in women's athletics